Boknakaran is a Norwegian musical group consisting of Ragnar Olsen, Jan Arvid Johansen, Malvin Skulbru and Pål Thorstensen. Helge Stangnes has written some of their songs. They have released five albums, and have toured a lot in Northern Norway.

External links
 Official homepage English version

Norwegian musical groups